Chlumčany is a municipality and village in Louny District in the Ústí nad Labem Region of the Czech Republic. It has about 600 inhabitants.

Administrative parts
The village of Vlčí is an administrative part of Chlumčany.

References

External links

Villages in Louny District